New Nauru Stadium is a planned stadium for the Pacific island nation of Nauru.

History 
Since at least 2011 the government of Nauru had planned to construct a new 10,000-seat national stadium on reclaimed phosphate mining land in the interior of the island as part of the island's unsuccessful bid to host the 2017 Pacific Mini Games. The venue, with a projected construction cost of AUD $4.2 million, would then have served as the home of Australian rules football in Nauru.

In July 2022 it was announced that Nauru had been selected to host the 2026 Micronesian Games, the first time the nation had been selected as host. As part of the announcement, Minister of Sports Maverick Eoe announced the upcoming construction of relevant and much-needed sports infrastructure projects, including an athletics stadium. The stadium would be modeled after the Majuro Track and Field Stadium being built by the Marshall Islands to host the 2023 edition of the same tournament. The Marshall Islands stadium also includes an association football pitch.

In October 2022 Deputy Minister for Sports Jesse Jeremiah and Secretary for Sports Dagan Kaierua visited the Marshall Islands capital Majuro to inspect the track and field stadium as part of Nauru’s infrastructure planning for the games.

Funding
Financial assistance for preparation for the tournament was offered from donor partners. These funds will be used, in part, for infrastructure projects. Several days after the original announcement Minister for Sports Eoe stated that Nauru was hoping for additional donors to build the stadium and a proper weightlifting gym facility.

During a November 2022 state visit, the government of Taiwan agreed to fund and assist with planning of the 2026 Micronesian Games, including covering the costs of the track and field stadium and other necessary facilities. The next step was for Nauru to present detailed plans and costing for the project.

References 

Sports venues in Nauru
Nauru
Soccer venues in Nauru